The 2021 Best of Nollywood Awards is the 13th edition of the ceremony that took place in Lokoja, Kogi State on 11 December 2021

The nominee list was revealed on 10 September 2021 by the founder of Best of Nollywood Awards at an event in Raddison Blu hotel in Ikeja, Lagos. The nominees unveiled included Stan Nze, Femi Adebayo, Lateef Adedimeji, Sola Sobowale, Mercy Aigbe, Iyabo Ojo and others. Pere Egbi, a Big Brother Naija Shine Ya Eye housemate was nominated in the Best Actor in a Leading Role category for his role in Butterflies by Biodun Stephen alongside Stan Nze, Blossom Chukwujekwu, Enyinna Nwigwe, Okey Uzoeshi and Uzor Arukwe. The Milkmaid and Rattlesnake: The Ahanna Story earned the highest nominations with 14 nominations each.

Rattlesnake: The Ahanna Story won the awards in Best Actor in a leading role, Best Actor in a Supporting role, Best Editing and Best Cinematography while The Milkmaid won Movie of the Year, Most Promising Actress and Director of the Year. A special recognition award was presented to veteran actress, Madam Kofo.

Awards

References 

2021
2021 film awards
2021 in Nigerian cinema